Harry Yates may refer to:
Harry Yates (footballer, born 1925) (1925–1987), English footballer for Huddersfield Town and Darlington
Harry Yates (footballer, born 1861) (1861–1932), English footballer for Aston Villa and Walsall
Harry Yates (RAF officer) (1896–1968), Canadian WW1 pilot
Harry D. Yates (1903–1996), American banker and politician from New York